Protomarctus is an extinct monospecific genus of  the Borophaginae subfamily of canids native to North America. It was an intermediate-size canid, and more predaceous than earlier borophagines.

The first specimen was found in Thomson Quarry, Sheep Creek Formation, Nebraska in a Hemingfordian layer. Specimens have since been found in present-day Colorado, as far west as California and as far southwest as New Mexico. They were short-faced, heavy-jawed canines.

References

Further reading
Martin, L.D. 1989. Fossil history of the terrestrial Carnivora. Pages 536 - 568 in J.L. Gittleman, editor. Carnivore Behavior, Ecology, and Evolution, Vol. 1. Comstock Publishing Associates: Ithaca.

Borophagines
Miocene carnivorans
Prehistoric mammals of North America
Prehistoric carnivoran genera
Taxa named by Xiaoming Wang
Fossil taxa described in 1999